GBA-8 (Skardu-II) is a constituency of Gilgit Baltistan Assembly which is currently represented by Muhammad Mesam Kazim of MWM.

Members

Election results

2009
Sheikh Nisar of PPP became member of assembly by getting 8,077 votes.

2015
Kacho Imtiaz Haider Khan of MWM won this seat by getting 10,411 votes.

References

Gilgit-Baltistan Legislative Assembly constituencies